The Nedbank Cup is the current name of South Africa's premier club soccer knockout tournament. While many formats have been used over the years, the tournament has always been based on the idea of giving lower league and amateur teams a chance to compete with clubs from the top league for the cup. The tournament is based on the English FA Cup, which has become known for "giant killings" (lower league clubs defeating a top-flight club).

History
The tournament was started in 1971 as the Life Challenge Cup, this name stayed in place until 1975. In 1976 and 1977, the tournament was known as the Benson and Hedges Trophy. From 1978 until 1987 the tournament was known as the Mainstay Cup. In 1988 the sponsorship was taken over by First National Bank, and was renamed the Bob Save Super Bowl. This name remained until 2001, however the tournament was not played in 1997. The tournament was again not played in 2002. The competition was then sponsored by ABSA between 2003 and 2007, and known as the ABSA Cup. Nedbank took over the sponsorship in 2008, and renamed the tournament the Nedbank Cup.

Format
The current format sees the 16 Premier Soccer League clubs, eight National First Division teams, as well as eight teams from the amateur ranks enter the main draw of 32 teams. The PSL teams enter the main draw automatically, while the NFD clubs need to play a single qualifier against other NFD clubs. The amateur teams go through a series of qualifiers to enter the main draw.

From the round of 32 onwards, teams are not seeded, and the first sides drawn receive home-ground advantage. There are no longer any replays in the tournament, and any games which end in a draw after 90 minutes are subject to 30 minutes extra time followed by penalties if necessary.

The winners receive prize money of R7 million. The winner also qualifies for the next season's CAF Confederation Cup.

Prize money

Past finals

Results by team

References

External links
Nedbank Cup official website
RSSSF competition history

 
South Africa
Soccer cup competitions in South Africa